Maros is a town in the South Sulawesi province of Indonesia close to the provincial capital of Makassar. It is the capital of the Maros Regency.

Maros is the location of the  Indonesian Cereals Research Institute, a branch of the  Indonesian Agency for Agricultural Research and Development.

In 2012, regional cement producer PT Semen Bosowa Maros began construction in Maros of a new clinker plant estimated to cost over $300 million. The clinker plant was expected to help the cement company increase production in the region in response to the growing demand for cement to support construction activities.

Maros Water Park is in Maros.

Rock art in caves
Nearby to Maros, in the area of the Maros Regency to the north of Makassar, are Pettakere cave and other prehistoric caves that contain significant rock art. Research suggests that the rock art is of considerable archaeological significance.

References 

Regency seats of South Sulawesi